Gåsvær is an island group in the municipality of Herøy in Nordland county, Norway. The main islands in the group include Nordgåsvær, Sørgåsvær, Flatøya, and Innerodden. Gåsvær Chapel is located on Sørgåsvær island.

The last permanent residents moved away from Gåsvær in 1990. Ferries to Gåsvær were ended in the summer of 2007. Many of the houses that remain on the islands are now used as holiday houses and summer houses.  The islands once had many residents who made a living by fishing and small farms on the islands.

See also
List of islands of Norway

References

Herøy, Nordland
Islands of Nordland
Uninhabited islands of Norway